Saint-Héand is a commune in the Loire department in central France, 12 kilometres from Saint-Étienne.

The name Héand comes from the Latin Eugendus; and was given to the town either by the saint himself when founding a monastery, or by pilgrims bringing relics there.

Population

Twin towns
Saint-Héand is twinned with Ingelfingen, Germany, since 1991.

See also
Communes of the Loire department

References

Communes of Loire (department)